The 27th Alberta Legislative Assembly was in session from April 14, 2008, to March 26, 2012, with the membership of the assembly determined by the results of the 2008 Alberta general election held on March 3, 2008. The Legislature officially resumed on April 14, 2008, and continued until the fifth session was prorogued on March 22, 2012, and dissolved on March 26, 2012, prior to the 2012 Alberta general election on April 23, 2012.

Alberta's twenty-sixth government was controlled by the majority Progressive Conservative Association of Alberta, led by Premier Ed Stelmach until his resignation on October 7, 2011, where he was succeeded by Alison Redford. The Official Opposition was led by David Swann of the Liberal Party, and later Raj Sherman. The Speaker was Ken Kowalski.

Election aftermath
The result of the 2008 election resulted in the Progressive Conservative party strengthening their ranks and picking up many districts. The results had fooled most of the pundits who were predicting quite the opposite.

Premier Ed Stelmach shuffled the Cabinet on March 13, 2008. The more notable members of his cabinet included Ron Liepert, Lindsay Blackett and Mel Knight. The opposition criticized Stelmach for not reducing the size of cabinet which had become bloated to record levels.

1st Session

The 1st Session of the 27th Alberta Legislature began on April 14, 2008, with the re-election of Ken Kowalski as speaker of the assembly defeating Laurie Blakeman on the first ballot.

The first throne speech during the assembly was read by Normie Kwong the next day. The 1st session was marked by a number of initiatives that cast the government in a negative light.

No Meet Committee
In March 2012 it came to light that the "Select Standing Committee on Privileges and Elections, Standing Orders and Printing", a committee of the Legislative Assembly had not sat for over three years, despite each member of the committee receiving a $1,000 stipend. The committee was chaired by Ray Prins, a backbench Progressive Conservative MLA for Lacombe-Ponoka who received an additional $38,000 per year for the appointment. The committee's 21 members included individuals from all political parities in the Assembly. In response, Premier Alison Redford instituted a freeze on committee pay and announced members would have to return six months of pay. After public criticism continued, Redford ordered all Progressive Conservative MLAs to pay back all pay received since the committee last met.

Budget

Budget 2012
Budget 2012: Investing in People was presented in the Legislature by Minister of Finance Ron Liepert on February 9, 2012. The budget projected CA$40.3-billion in revenue, with $41.1-billion in expenses and a total deficit of $886-million. The budget would outline government direction towards results-based budgeting and reviews of all government programs and services, and lay the groundwork for three-year funding cycles for municipalities, school boards and post-secondary institutions. The budget projected a path to balance in the next fiscal year, with a projected surplus of $952-million. The projected economic growth for 2012 in Alberta was 3.8%, and West Texas Intermediate benchmark at USD$99.25 per barrel.

Membership in the 27th Alberta Legislative Assembly

Seating plan

Official Seating Plan (Retrieved December 9, 2009)

Standings changes during the 27th Assembly

 Guy Boutilier began caucusing with the Wildrose Alliance on June 24, 2010, but kept independent status due to a $40,000.00 difference in private members research funding.
 Raj Sherman joined the Liberal party, but did not officially join the Liberal caucus, however, he did become the Liberal leader on September 10, 2011.

References

External links
Alberta Legislative Assembly
Legislative Assembly of Alberta Members Book
By-elections 1905 to present

Terms of the Alberta Legislature
2008 in Canadian politics
2009 in Canadian politics
2010 in Canadian politics
2011 in Canadian politics
2012 in Canadian politics
2008 in Alberta
2009 in Alberta
2010 in Alberta
2011 in Alberta
2012 in Alberta

de:Legislativversammlung von Alberta
fr:Assemblée législative de l'Alberta
zh:亞伯塔省省議會